Get Into It is the seventh album by rapper/DJ, The Egyptian Lover.  The album was released on June 2, 1998 for Egyptian Empire Records and was produced by Egyptian Lover.  The album was a mild success and marked the first time since 1988's Filthy that Egyptian Lover made it to the Billboard Charts, making it to #72 on the Top R&B/Hip-Hop Albums chart.  The album, however, did not produce any hit singles.

Track listing
"Love Theme" – 4:16
"Got Me Goin' (Crazy)" – 6:49
""Me"" – 3:32
"90's Ladies" – 3:26
"Let's Get It On" – 3:47
"Get Into It" – 2:42
"$" – 5:09
"Tear The Roof Off" – 4:36
"Dance Music" – 5:13
"Jam" – 4:09

References

Egyptian Lover albums
1990 albums
Albums produced by Egyptian Lover